Women in Film & Television International (WIFTI) is a global network of non-profit membership chapters. Established in 1997, it is dedicated to advancing professional development and achievement for women working in all areas of film, video, and other screen-based media.

Aims 
 Enhance the international visibility of women in the entertainment industry.
 Facilitate and encourage communication and cooperation internationally.
 Develop bold international projects and initiatives.
 Stimulate professional development and global networking opportunities for women.
 Promote and support chapter development.
 Celebrate the achievements of women in all areas of the industry.
 Encourage diverse and positive representation of women in screen-based media worldwide.

History 
Women in Film Los Angeles was founded in 1973 by Tichi Wilkerson Kassel. After several Women in Film organizations were established in a variety of cities around the globe, Women in Film and Television International WIFTI was organized in the mid-1990s.

1973–1997

WIFTI chapters 

 Main sources:
  

Notes
1.  WIF Los Angeles — Official Website: WomenInFilm.org
  — see also, Women in Film Crystal + Lucy Awards
...  WIFV Washington D.C. — Women in Film & Video-DC Women of Vision Awards
  — The founders include Ginny Durrin, Judy Herbert, Sharon Ferguson, Christine Brim, Jan Hatcher, Norma Davidoff, Pat McMurray, Catherine Anderson, Lauren Versel, Michal Carr, Elise Reeder, and Polly Krieger.

2.  WFTV United Kingdom — Official Website: WFTV UK
  — The founders include Lynda La Plante, Norma Heyman, Jenne Casarroto, Dawn French, Joan Collins and Janet Street-Porter.

3.  WIFT NZ — Official Website:  WIFT NZ
  History of WIFT in NZ, researched and written by Helen Martin, traces the history of Women in Film and Television, from the establishment of WIF in Los Angeles in 1973, through the founding of WIFT Wellington in 1994, to the 10th anniversary of WIFT Auckland in 2005. 
4.  , WIFT VIC and WIFT WA were operating as individual organisations, while WIFT NSW was in the process of transitioning up into WIFT Australia.

Programs 
 Women in Film-LA presents annual awards at their Women in Film Crystal + Lucy Awards ceremonies. In 1988, they presented the Lillian Gish Award for excellence in episodic directing.
 Women in Film Foundation's Film Finishing Fund supports films by, for or about women. 

 There are 22 affiliate organizations of WIFTI in the United States. The Washington D.C. affiliate, Women in Film & Video, has presented Women of Vision awards annually since 1994 to honor creative and technical achievements of women in media. Women in Film & Video has held a WIFV annual film festival.
 Women In Film & Television Short Film Showcase, or WIFTI Short-Case, is a demonstration of WIFTI members' creativity, vision, and artistry. 

 WIFTI Summits have been held bi-annually.

See also 
 Women in Film Crystal + Lucy Awards
 Women in Film & Video-DC Women of Vision Awards
 New York Women in Film & Television
 Women in Film and Television (South Africa)
 UK Women in Film and Television Awards
Women in Film and Television New Zealand Awards

Related organizations
 Women in film
 International Association of Women in Radio and Television
 ReFrame

References

External links 
 Women in Film & TV International (official website)
 Kansas City Women in Film & Television

Women's film organizations
Organizations established in 1973
International cultural organizations
Women in television
Film organizations in the United States